Mangrove is a 2020 historical drama film directed by British director Steve McQueen and co-written by McQueen and Alastair Siddons, about the Mangrove restaurant in west London and the 1971 trial of the Mangrove Nine. It stars Letitia Wright, Shaun Parkes, Malachi Kirby, Rochenda Sandall, Alex Jennings and Jack Lowden.

The film was released as part of the anthology series Small Axe on BBC One on 15 November 2020 and Amazon Prime Video on 20 November 2020. It premiered as the opening film at the 58th New York Film Festival on 24 September 2020.

Plot 

Frank Crichlow is a Trinidadian immigrant opening a new restaurant, the Mangrove, in Notting Hill in the late 1960s. Notting Hill was then a Caribbean immigrant neighborhood. On opening night Constable Frank Pulley looks on and comments to a fellow constable that Black people must be kept in their place.

After the restaurant closes for the night Pulley aggressively confronts Crichlow and accuses Crichlow of running an establishment frequented by drug dealers, gamblers, and prostitutes. Thereafter, Pulley conducts a series of violent raids on the Mangrove, driving Crichlow to financial distress.

The neighborhood rallies in support of the Mangrove and a march is organized to protest police conduct. The police surround the protestors and provoke violence. A number of protesters are immediately brought up on minor charges including Frank Crichlow, British-born activist Barbara Beese, Trinidadian Black Panther leader Altheia Jones-LeCointe, Trinidadian activist Darcus Howe, Rhodan Gordon, Anthony Carlisle Innis, Rothwell Kentish, Rupert Boyce, and Godfrey Millett. A year later those protesters – the Mangrove Nine – are charged with the serious crimes of riot and affray.

At their 1970 trial the Mangrove Nine make race an issue, asking for an all Black jury. The presiding judge, Judge Edward Clarke, declines the request and refuses to give justification. The defendants use their right to challenge white jury members several times, and the prosecutors challenge black jury members. As witnesses give their testimony, Judge Clarke plainly gives preferential treatment to the prosecution. Jones-LeCointe and Howe, representing themselves, point out fabrications in Pulley's testimony and flaws in the medical examiner's testimony. Pulley attempts to feed answers to policeman Royce while he is on the stand, resulting in Pulley's expulsion from the courtroom until his fellow policemen have given their testimony. Barbara Beese then interrupts a witness policeman's gleaming introduction by chanting "the officer has nothing to do with the case" and is soon joined by the other defendants and observers. Judge Clarke reprimands the defendants and observers for disrupting the proceedings and launches an adjournment so emotions can settle. Crichlow and Howe are roughly dragged out of the court box by court officers and thrown into solitary basement cells for disruption. Upon pushback from defending counsels Ian Macdonald and Mr. Croft, Judge Clarke replaces all court officers.

Crichlow is advised by his counsel, Mr. Croft, to plead guilty and abandon his fellow defendants to their own sentences. Crichlow pleads innocent after Jones-LeCointe objects and reveals she is pregnant. The jury acquits Crichlow, Howe, and three other defendants. The judge, commenting that there was evidence of racism on both sides, gives lenient sentences to the four who were convicted.

Cast 

 Letitia Wright as Altheia Jones-LeCointe
 Malachi Kirby as Darcus Howe
 Shaun Parkes as Frank Crichlow
 Rochenda Sandall as Barbara Beese
 Nathaniel Martello-White as Rhodan Gordon
 Darren Braithwaite as Anthony Carlisle Innis
 Richie Campbell as Rothwell Kentish
 Duane Facey-Pearson as Rupert Boyce
 Jumayn Hunter as Godfrey Millett
 Jack Lowden as Ian Macdonald
 Sam Spruell as Police Constable Frank Pulley
 Alex Jennings as Judge Edward Clarke
 Samuel West as Mr. Hill, prosecuting barrister
 Gershwyn Eustache Jr. as Eddie LeCointe
 Gary Beadle as Dolston Isaacs
 Richard Cordery as Mr. Croft
 Derek Griffiths as C. L. R. James
 Jodhi May as Selma James
 Llewella Gideon as Aunt Betty
 Thomas Coombes as PC Royce
 Joseph Quinn as PC Dixon
 Tahj Miles as Kendrick Manning
 Michelle Greenidge as Mrs. Manning
 Joe Tucker as Court Officer
 James Hillier as the police Chief Inspector
 Stephen O'Neill as the Magistrate
 Ben Caplan as Mr. Stedman
 Stefan Kalipha as the card player
 Jay Simpson as the Duty Officer
 Doreen Ingleton as Mrs. Tetley
 Akbar Kurtha as Dr Chadee
 Shem Hamilton as Benson
 Tayo Jarrett as Linton
 Tyrone Huggins as Granville

Casting 
Shaun Parkes was cast as Frank Crichlow, owner of the Mangrove restaurant, and Malachi Kirby was cast as Darcus Howe, an activist and member of the Mangrove Nine, after auditions. Wright was cast as Altheia Jones-LeCointe, a leader of the British Black Panthers and one of the Mangrove Nine, after a meeting with McQueen and casting director Gary Davy. Wright had been unaware of the Mangrove Nine before being approached for the film, saying in an interview with the New York Times that "it’s not in the textbooks at school. The stronghold of Black History Month [October] in the U.K. is American history ... You have mostly — and I honor and respect them always — Martin Luther King and Malcolm X on the posters, but you don’t have the Altheias."

Production 
Steve McQueen began developing the Small Axe anthology series in the early 2010s, and while it was initially conceived as a serialized story, he decided to pursue an anthology of distinct films. Mangrove is the longest film in the series and was released as the first of the anthology. Cast member Letitia Wright recalled that McQueen said he chose to tell this story because "The window for our elders’ stories to be told is closing. We can't allow them to pass away and become our ancestors without them seeing themselves, their culture and everything they've contributed to the country represented onscreen."

Release 
The film was selected for the 2020 Cannes Film Festival alongside Lovers Rock, but the Festival was canceled due to the COVID-19 pandemic. The film later premiered at the 2020 New York Film Festival, which was held virtually, alongside Lovers Rock and Red, White and Blue. It was the opening film at the 64th BFI London Film Festival on 7 October 2020. It premiered on BBC One and became available for streaming on BBC iPlayer in the United Kingdom on 15 November 2020, and became available for streaming on Amazon Prime Video in the United States on 20 November.

Critical reception 
Review aggregator Metacritic assigned the film a weighted average score of 90 out of 100, based on 24 critics, indicating "universal acclaim." On Rotten Tomatoes the film holds an approval rating of 98% based on 104 reviews, with an average rating of 9.03/10. The site's critics consensus reads, "Anchored by strong performances and an even stronger sense of conviction, Mangrove is a powerful indictment of institutional racism."

K. Austin Collins of Rolling Stone commended the film's depiction of community life at the Mangrove restaurant, writing that "the power of Mangrove is in precisely the details that give us this impression, often without us even noticing. There’s something stealthy in its awareness, in the ways it accrues crumbs of insight and observation and dispenses them throughout the narrative without us even noticing. You emerge from the movie with an enriched, nearly felt sense of the Mangrove as a place, not just as a symbol."

Peter Bradshaw of The Guardian positively reviewed the courtroom drama elements of the film, writing that "Mangrove is clear-sighted and genuinely passionate with performances which are straight from the heart. You are plunged right back into a situation where really dangerous issues are really at stake, and where at any time Crichlow might be tempted to sell out his co-defendants by taking a guilty plea." Bradshaw and several other critics compared the film favorably to another 2020 courtroom drama film, The Trial of the Chicago 7.

Paul Gilroy, a Black British writer and historian, commended the Small Axe series in an interview with The Guardian, saying, "What’s exciting about Steve’s films, the Mangrove one in particular, is that they are an attempt to offer a historical transfusion that, in the present condition, can give younger viewers and mainstream viewers an alternative sense of what the history of this country might be over the last 50 years."

The film appeared on several critics' top ten lists of best films from 2020.

References 

2020 films
2020 drama films
2020s historical drama films
British historical drama films
American historical drama films
BBC Film films
Amazon Studios films
Films directed by Steve McQueen
Films set in London
British courtroom films
Notting Hill
2020s English-language films
2020s American films
2020s British films